George Richard Seage III (March 11, 1957 - January 2, 2021) was an epidemiologist and a professor at the Harvard T.H. Chan School of Public Health and Director of the school's Program in the Epidemiology of Infectious Diseases. Seage specialized in HIV/AIDS research with a focus on “the behavioural and biological aspects of adult and pediatric HIV transmission, natural history and treatment.” At the Boston University School of Public Health (BUSPH), Seage was an Adjunct Associate Professor of Epidemiology in the Department of Epidemiology, Director of the Interdisciplinary Concentration in the Epidemiology of Infectious Diseases, and Director of the Pediatric AIDS Cohort Study (PHACS) data and analysis center.

Biography
Seage was born in Bethpage, New York to George R. and Lorraine Angelikas Seage. He was raised in Massapequa Park, New York.  

He graduated from Berner High School, earned a ScD and MPH from Boston University School of Public Health and BS in biology from Stony Brook University. 

Seage passed away from Acute myeloid leukemia on January 2, 2021. He is survived by his parents, wife Ann Aschengrau and son Greg.

Research

Seage “has been the Principal Investigator of a number of studies that have elucidated the biological and behavioral factors associated with HIV transmission, acquisition, and prevention–including the Boston Partners Study (BPS), the Boston Young Men's Study (BYMS), and the HIV Network of Prevention Trials Vaccine Preparedness Study (HIVNET VPS). He was subsequently the Principal Investigator for the Pediatric HIV/AIDS Cohort Study (PHACS), Data and Operations Center, a multidisciplinary initiative co-funded by eight NIH Institutes, PI of an NIH RO1 “Modeling the effect of the Botswana Combination HIV Prevention Project” - and was the Program Director of one of the few NIH training grants in infectious disease epidemiology and biodefense.”

Awards and honors
Seage has received the Massachusetts Governor's Award for Outstanding Contributions to AIDS Research and Fenway Community Health Center Research Award.

Selected publications 

Essentials of Epidemiology in Public Health textbook; coauthor Ann Aschengrau Boston University School of Public Health

References

External links
Publications

American epidemiologists
Harvard School of Public Health faculty
Boston University School of Public Health alumni
Boston University School of Public Health faculty
HIV/AIDS researchers
Stony Brook University alumni
1957 births
Public health researchers
2021 deaths
People from Massapequa Park, New York
Berner High School alumni
Deaths from cancer